The For Carnation is the eponymously titled album by The For Carnation, released on April 4, 2000 through Domino and Touch and Go Records.

Track listing

Personnel 
Adapted from the Promised Works liner notes.

The For Carnation
 Bobb Bruno – guitar, keyboards, sampler
 Todd Cook – bass guitar
 Steve Goodfriend – drums
 Brian McMahan – vocals, guitar, keyboards, design
 Michael McMahan – guitar
Additional musicians
 Alison Chesley – cello (1, 6)
 Kim Deal – vocals (5)
 Dan Fliegel – congas (2)
 Christian Frederickson – viola (1, 6)
 Rachel Haden – vocals (4)
 Noel Kupersmith – acoustic bass guitar (1, 6)
 Rafe Mandel – keyboards (1, 2)
 Britt Walford – drums (3)

Production and additional personnel
 David Babbitt – design
 Heather Cantrell – photography
 Rod Cervera – recording
 Tom Grimley – recording
 John McEntire – mixing, recording
 Roger Seibel – mastering

Release history

References

External links 
 

2000 albums
The For Carnation albums
Touch and Go Records albums